That's My Boy is a British sitcom starring Mollie Sugden that aired on ITV from 23 October 1981 to 4 April 1986. The series was written and created by Pam Valentine and Michael Ashton, who later wrote My Husband and I (1987–88), which also starred Mollie Sugden. It was produced for the ITV network by Yorkshire Television, and, although the first three series are set in London, they were filmed in and around Harrogate in North Yorkshire.

Plot

When Ida Willis (Mollie Sugden) gets a new job as housekeeper to Robert Price (Christopher Blake) and his wife Angie (Jennifer Lonsdale), she moves into their London flat and soon discovers that Robert is the son she gave up for adoption when he was a baby, and she proceeds to call him Shane, the name she gave him when he was born. Other characters include Ida's troublesome brother Wilfred (Harold Goodwin) and Robert's adoptive mother Cecilia Price (Clare Richards), an upmarket widow with whom Ida does not get on. In the fourth series, they move to the fictitious Yorkshire village of Little Birchmarch, where Ida befriends Robert's mousy receptionist, Miss Parfitt (Deddie Davies).

Cast
Mollie Sugden – Ida Willis
Christopher Blake – Robert Price
Jennifer Lonsdale – Angie Price
Clare Richards – Mrs Price (series 1–4)
Harold Goodwin – Wilfred Willis
Deddie Davies – Miss Parfitt (series 4–5)
Thelma Whiteley – Mrs Cross (series 5)

Episodes

Series 1 (1981)

Series 2 (1983)

Christmas Special (1983)

Series 3 (1984)

Christmas Special (1984)

Series 4 (1985)

Series 5 (1986)

DVD releases

All five series are now available individually from Network DVD.

A complete VHS collection of That's My Boy was also released.

ITV3 started repeating the series on 10 February 2020, with minor edits.

A single episode of That's My Boy has been released in the UK as part of a DVD compilation called Classic ITV Christmas Comedy.

References
Mark Lewisohn Radio Times Guide to TV Comedy, BBC Worldwide Ltd, 2003

External links

1981 British television series debuts
1986 British television series endings
1980s British sitcoms
ITV sitcoms
Television series about adoption
Television series by Yorkshire Television
Television series by ITV Studios
English-language television shows
Television shows set in London
Television shows set in Yorkshire